Zornitsa Marinova (born 6 January 1987 in Veliko Tarnovo) is a retired Bulgarian rhythmic gymnast. She represented Bulgaria in two editions of the Olympic Games (2004 and 2008), and also contributed to a fourth-place effort in the group all-around tournament at the 2007 World Rhythmic Gymnastics Championships in Patras, Greece. At the 2004 Summer Olympics in Athens, Marinova claimed a bronze medal in the same program as a member of the Bulgarian gymnastics squad. During her sporting career, Marinova trained for Iliana Gymnastics Club in Levski under her head coach Adriana Dunavska and her assistant coach Mariela Pashalieva.

Career

2004–2007

Marinova made her official worldwide debut, as a 17-year-old teen, at the 2004 Summer Olympics in Athens, where she captured a bronze medal for the Bulgarian squad in the group all-around competition with a composite score of 48.600 (23.400 in the ribbon category and 25.200 in the hoops and balls), joining on top of the podium by veterans Zhaneta Ilieva, Eleonora Kezhova, Kristina Rangelova, and twin sisters Galina and Vladislava Tancheva.

At the 2007 World Rhythmic Gymnastics Championships in Patras, Greece, Marinova and her newly structured squad missed the podium by two-thousandths of a point with a fourth-place score in 33.600.

2008 Summer Olympics

At the 2008 Summer Olympics in Beijing, Marinova competed for her second straight time in the group all-around tournament, after attaining an automatic spot in the women's rhythmic gymnastics team from the World Championships. Teaming with Tsveta Kousseva, Yolita Manolova, Maya Paunovska, Ioanna Tantcheva, and Tatyana Tongova in the competition, Marinova performed a double routine using five ropes (16.750) and a combination of three hoops and two clubs (16.800) to deliver the Bulgarian squad a fifth-place score in 33.550.

See also

 List of Olympic medalists in gymnastics (women)

References

External links
 
 
 
 

1987 births
Living people
Bulgarian rhythmic gymnasts
Gymnasts at the 2004 Summer Olympics
Gymnasts at the 2008 Summer Olympics
Medalists at the 2004 Summer Olympics
Olympic gymnasts of Bulgaria
Olympic bronze medalists for Bulgaria
Olympic medalists in gymnastics
People from Veliko Tarnovo
Gymnasts from Sofia
Medalists at the Rhythmic Gymnastics European Championships
Medalists at the Rhythmic Gymnastics World Championships